Stylophora is a genus of colonial stony corals in the family Pocilloporidae. They are commonly known as cat's paw corals or birdsnest corals. They are native to the Red Sea, the Indo-Pacific region and eastwards as far as the Pitcairn Islands.

Characteristics
Members of this genus are branching corals. The finger-like branches vary in width and have blunt tips. The growth forms and colours are variable depending on many factors, including the level of light and the amount of water  movement. The colour may be orange, pink, magenta, purple, green or brown.

Species
The following species are listed in the World Register of Marine Species (WoRMS):

 †Stylophora confusa Duncan, 1880 
 Stylophora danae Milne Edwards & Haime, 1850
 Stylophora erythraea Von Marenzeller, 1907
 Stylophora flabellata Quelch, 1886
 †Stylophora gigas Hoffmeister, 1945 
 †Stylophora granulata Duncan & Wall, 1865 
 Stylophora kuehlmanni Scheer & Pillai, 1983
 Stylophora lobata Gardiner, 1898
 Stylophora madagascarensis Veron, 2000
 Stylophora mamillata Scheer & Pillai, 1983
 †Stylophora minuta Duncan, 1868
 Stylophora pistillata Esper, 1797
 Stylophora subseriata (Ehrenberg, 1834)
 Stylophora wellsi Scheer, 1964

References

Pocilloporidae
Taxa named by August Friedrich Schweigger
Scleractinia genera